The 2000–01 season was Stoke City's 94th season in the Football League and the seventh in the third tier.

Manager Gudjon Thordarson again brought in some of his fellow countrymen as Stoke were looking to gain promotion to the First Division. The close season saw Stoke beat higher placed teams in the form of Birmingham City and Liverpool but a goalless draw with Wycombe Wanderers emphasized that pre-season results mean nothing. Stoke's form was steady if not spectacular but two terrible cup exists, defeat to Nuneaton Borough in the FA Cup and a shocking 8–0 loss at home to Liverpool in the League Cup threatened to derail Stoke's season. But Stoke responded by going 12 matches unbeaten and for the second season running Stoke entered the lottery of the play-offs. Walsall were the opponents and after a 0–0 draw the "Saddlers" proved to be too strong at the Bescot Stadium and won the match 4–2 leaving Stoke facing a fourth season in the third tier.

Season review

League
The Icelandic invasion of Stoke-on-Trent was now in full flow with no less than ten Scandinavian players agreeing to join the club. Amongst them were club record signing Brynjar Gunnarsson, the manager's son Bjarni Guðjónsson, Swedish full-back Mikael Hansson and new forwards Stefán Þórðarson and Ríkharður Daðason although Daðason took until October before he could complete his move from Norwegian football. Stoke went on a pre-season tour of Iceland and then had two impressive results against Birmingham City and Liverpool. Tony Dorigo and Wayne Thomas both joined the side before the season opener at home to Wycombe Wanderers with excitement rife after the good pre-season. But a frustrating 0–0 followed and those it seemed that pre-season results are pretty pointless.

Stoke soon started to get their act together and began to find the back of the net regularly with Peterborough United beaten 3–0 and Oxford United 4–0 and a 3–3 draw away at Reading. The first Potteries derby ended 1–1 but in the next match against Rotherham United on-loan striker Marvin Robinson broke his leg in a nasty collision with the Rotherham goalkeeper. A last minute victory over Millwall was a vital win against a promotion rival and with the arrival of Dadason it seemed that Stoke could continue their push for an automatic position but two truly awful defeats in the FA and League Cup saw the feeling around the club drop and after a 3–1 defeat at home to bottom of the table Luton Town there was a major danger that those results could affect their league form. But City to their credit got their act together and went on a 13 match unbeaten run cementing their place in the play-offs.

But Stoke not making life easy for themselves lost to several lowly placed sides increasing the risk of being caught but three wins at the end of the season saw Stoke finish in 5th position with 77 points and they come up against an impressive Walsall side. The first leg at the Britannia was a tense affair which saw Ben Petty 'sacrifice' himself to prevent a goal for Walsall and the match ended 0–0. The second leg started well enough for Stoke with Graham Kavanagh putting City into the lead but a goalkeeping howler from Gavin Ward gifted the "Saddlers" an equaliser. In a mad 15 minute spell in the second half Walsall scored three without reply and despite Peter Thorne scoring it was too little to late and Stoke would have to try again to gain that promotion out of the third tier.

FA Cup
Stoke were on the receiving end of a cup shock as after a 0–0 draw at home with non-league Nuneaton Borough, the replay was a stereotypical cup upset waiting to happen with heavy rain a muddy pitch and a hostile home crowd. And it all proved too scripted for Stoke as in the last minute Marc McGregor secured a famous win for Nuneaton.

League Cup
Stoke had a decent run to the fourth round after beating York City 5–1, Premier League Charlton Athletic on away goals after a thrilling 5–5 aggregate score and a 3–2 over Barnsley saw Stoke earn a glamour tie against Liverpool. But it quickly turned into a nightmare for Stoke as Liverpool ran riot scoring with every shot they took and ended up with an 8–0 victory, Stoke's worst home defeat.

League Trophy
As holders Stoke were looking to retain the Football League Trophy and they made it to the northern section semi final against local rivals Port Vale after beating Scarborough (3–1), Halifax Town (3–2) and Walsall (4–0). The tie was originally scheduled to be played at Vale Park but with several failed attempts to play the match due to a waterlogged pitch the match was moved to the Britannia Stadium. Vale won a dour match 2–1 after extra time and they went on to lift the trophy.

Final league table

Results
Stoke's score comes first

Legend

Pre-Season Friendlies

Football League Second Division

Second Division play-offs

FA Cup

League Cup

League Trophy

Squad statistics

References

Stoke City F.C. seasons
Stoke City